Tibrewal is an Indian (Bania) toponymic surname from Jhunjhunu in Rajasthan, India. Its variants include Tibrewala, Tibdewal and Tibarewal. The word "tibar" (or tiba) in the local Rajasthani-language means small sand hills, and people who had their homes on such hilly areas in the desert region of Rajasthan were called Tibrewal. People with this surname or its variants include:

 Navrang Lal Tibrewal
 Sheo Bhagwan Tibrewal
 Hareesh Tibrewala

Indian surnames
Surnames of Indian origin
Surnames of Hindustani origin
Hindu surnames
Toponymic surnames
People from Jhunjhunu district
Bania communities